Carl Johann Christian Zimmermann, also known as Hans Zimmermann (8 November 1831, Elbing - 18 March 1911, Hamburg) was a German architect and construction manager.

Biography 
  
His father was a construction manager who briefly served as the Mayor of Elbing. He initially studied art history at the University of Königsberg, passed the surveyor's examination and was involved in building a section of the Prussian Eastern Railway. From 1854 to 1856, he studied at the Bauakademie in Berlin and passed the construction manager examination.

In 1864, he moved to Breslau, where he had been elected head of the Building Department; responsible for building construction, town planning, and pipeline networks. He resigned that office in 1872.

From 1872 to 1908, he was in charge of urban development and the environment in Hamburg. He also assisted Franz Andreas Meyer in planning the Speicherstadt at Hamburg harbor. He resigned at the age of seventy-seven. Fritz Schumacher was chosen to be his successor.

He died at the age of eighty, was cremated, and interred at the Friedhof Ohlsdorf. His grave has not been preserved.

In 2005–06, the Museum of Architecture, Wrocław (Breslau) held an exhibition of his plans and drawings called "Architect in Service of the City".

References

Further reading 
 "Zimmermann, Carl Johann Christian". In: Franklin Kopitzsch, Dirk Brietzke (Eds.): Hamburgische Biografie. Vol.3. Wallstein, Göttingen 2006, pp. 426–428.
 Dieter Schädel: Auf den Spuren von C. J. Christian Zimmermann in Hamburg. Hamburger Baudirektor der Gründerzeit von 1872–1908. Drei Architekturrundgänge zu Bauten von C. J. Chr. Zimmermann. Hamburger Feuerkasse, in cooperation with the Fritz-Schumacher-Institut, Hamburg 2004.

External links 

1831 births
1911 deaths
19th-century German architects
People from Elbląg